Austin Shuey Mann (January 14, 1847 – September 19, 1912) was a lawyer, orange grove owner, and politician who served in the Florida Senate and Florida House of Representatives. He represented Hernando County.

Mann was born in Ohio. He later lived in the area of Crystal River, Florida and had orange groves.

He served in the Florida Senate from 1883 until 1887. He was in the Florida House in 1891.

Mannfield, Florida, the county seat until Inverness was chosen to replace it, was named for him. It is now a ghost town in the Withlacoochee State Forest.

His daughter, May Mann, married William Sherman Jennings, who served as Governor of Florida.

References

1847 births
1912 deaths
People from Florida
People from Ohio
19th-century American lawyers